Enrico Mollo (24 July 1913 – 10 March 1992) was an Italian racing cyclist. He won the 1935 edition of the Giro di Lombardia.

Major results

1935
 1st Giro di Lombardia
1936
 1st Coppa Bernocchi
 2nd Giro del Lazio
 3rd Tre Valli Varesine
 9th Overall Giro d'Italia
1937
 3rd Overall Giro d'Italia
1938
 2nd Giro della Romagna
 3rd Giro dell'Umbria
1940
 2nd Overall Giro d'Italia
1941
 2nd Giro dell'Umbria
1946
 1st Giro dell'Apennino
 1st Tre Valli Varesine
 1st Coppa Città di Asti

General classification results timeline

References

External links
 

1913 births
1992 deaths
Italian male cyclists
Cyclists from Turin